E'Last (Korean: 엘라스트, pronounced "El-Last" and commonly stylized as E'LAST), previously known as EBoyz (이보이즈), is a South Korean boy band formed by E Entertainment. The group is composed of eight members: Rano, Choi In, Seungyeop, Baekgyeul, Romin, Won Hyuk, Wonjun, and Yejun. They debuted on June 9, 2020, with their first mini album Day Dream and its lead single "Swear" (Korean : 기사의 맹세, literally "Knight's Oath").

History 
E'Last is the first group of E Entertainment. Their name is an abbreviation of "Everlasting", which either means "Eternity" and "Infinity. Won Hyuk and Wonjun were contestants on Produce X 101 and were the first two to be introduced into the EBoyz group. They were joined during summer 2019 by Choi In, Rano, and Seungyeop.

The members released their own reality show, named Unlock, prior to their debut. The official YouTube channel of the group uploaded an episode every Friday, showcasing the boys’ daily lives and debut preparations.

The group debuted on June 9, 2020, with their first extended play Day Dream, featuring the title track "Swear".  In their debut album, the members said in an interview that Rano, Baekgyeul, Won Hyuk, and Wonjun participated in writing and composing songs.

The group returned with their second extended play Awake and its title track "Tears Of Chaos" on November 11, 2020. Wonjun was not involved in the comeback due to scheduling conflicts, as he was the host of EBS show Boni Hani.

In April 2021, it was announced that members Choi In, Seungyeop, Romin, and Wonjun would form the new sub-unit E'Last U.  The sub-unit released their debut digital single "Remember" on May 19, 2021.

On September 29, 2021, the group released their first single album Dark Dream and its title track of the same name.

On April 27, 2022, the group released their third extended play Roar and its title track "Creature".

On January 3, 2023, the agency confirmed that Seungyeob will enter the military mandatory military service on January 31 at the 28th Military Circle Military Enlistment Training Center.

Members 
 Rano (라노) - Leader
 Choi In (최인)
 Seungyeop (승엽)
 Baekgyeul (백결)
 Romin (로민)
 Won Hyuk (원혁)
 Wonjun (원준)
 Yejun (예준)

Discography

Extended plays

Single albums

Singles

Videography

Music Videos

References

External links 
 E'LAST at E Entertainment

K-pop music groups
South Korean boy bands
Musical groups established in 2020
2020 establishments in South Korea